Highway M16 is a Ukrainian international highway (M-highway) connecting Odesa to Kuchurhan on the border with Moldova, where it continues as national road M5. The M16 is part of European route E58 and European route E581.

The M16 serves as a link between the longer M14 highway in Ukraine that runs from Odesa to the eastern border with Russia in Donetsk Oblast and the Moldovan M5 highway that traverses Moldova from the north to southeast towards Odesa.

Junction list

See also

 Roads in Ukraine
 Ukraine Highways
 International E-road network
 Pan-European corridors

References

External links
 International Roads in Ukraine in Russian
 European Roads in Russian

Roads in Odesa Oblast
Roads in Ukraine